Klondike is an unincorporated community in Corydon Township in McKean County, Pennsylvania, United States. Klondike is located along Pennsylvania Route 59/Pennsylvania Route 321 east of the Allegheny Reservoir.

References

Unincorporated communities in McKean County, Pennsylvania
Unincorporated communities in Pennsylvania